Clement George Freiherr von und zu Franckenstein (28 May 1944 – 9 May 2019) was an English actor. He was best known for portraying President D'Astier in The American President (1995), the English Investor in Lionheart (1990), the Opening Man in Death Becomes Her (1992), Pascal Ferney in The Evening Star (1996), Frances Triebverbrecher in Take Me Home Tonight (2011), Sen. Sestimus Amydias in Hail, Caesar! (2016), and Boss Cass in the Ty the Tasmanian Tiger video game series (2002–2005).

Biography
Born in Sunninghill, then in Buckinghamshire, on 28 May 1944, Franckenstein was the only child of Editha and Georg von und zu Franckenstein; his father was an Austrian Reichsfreiherr and diplomat who stayed in England after the Anschluss and received a British knighthood and British nationality. Franckenstein's parents died in an aircraft crash in Germany on 14 October 1953, and from the age of nine he was brought up by his parents' British friends. He was educated at Sunningdale School and Eton College.

He became an actor, initially going to castings as Clement St George as he thought "his real name might scare people". He moved to California in 1972 and joined the gentleman-playboy expat Brits like David Niven. Playing with Hugh Grant and Mick Jagger, he was a long-standing member of the Beverly Hills Cricket Club. He never married, and was devoted to his beloved cat Tallulah.

Franckenstein appeared in some eighty films; sometimes as the debonair escort for the leading lady or just wearing a leather thong. He was in Young Frankenstein, Robin Hood: Men in Tights and The American President, but was often low down the cast list or uncredited. He appeared as a corpse in Murder She Wrote.

He said that California changed between the 1970s and the 1990s, as he told the Daily Telegraph in 1994: "In the 1970s, life was easy, everyone was laid-back, everyone had a good time ... Now it has become oppressive, charmless. You can't smoke in restaurants, everyone is carrying around boxes of condoms, and at parties now there's this thing called the "no host bar" - you have to pay for your own bloody drinks. I mean it's just not on". 

Mr von Franckenstein told stories from his life for the Joe Frank radio show, 'Clement at Christmas', from his childhood though his early days in Hollywood, the first half of the show.

Von Franckenstein died from hypoxia at the Cedars-Sinai Medical Center in Los Angeles, on 9 May 2019 at the age of 74. He had been in an induced coma for ten days.

Selected filmography

The Slams (1973) - Minor Role (uncredited)
Young Frankenstein (1974) - Villager Screaming at the Monster From the Bars (uncredited)
Lepke (1975) - Bugsy Siegel
Marilyn and the Senator (1975)
Fantasm (1976) - High Priest (segment "Blood Orgy")
Hughes and Harlow: Angels in Hell (1977) - Reggie
The Happy Hooker Goes to Washington (1977) - Doctor
The Gypsy Warriors (1978) - British M.P.
Time After Time (1979) - Bobby
Cataclysm (1980) - (voice)
Six Weeks (1982) - TV Interviewer
Olivia (1983) - Lawyer
The Man Who Wasn't There (1983) - Grey Crusher
Monaco Forever (1984) - B.B.C. Broadcaster
KGB: The Secret War (1985) - Yuri Glebov
Mission Kill (1986) - Ian Kennedy
The Boost (1988) - Maitre D' - Mortons
The Lords of Magick (1989) - Edgar
Underground (1989) - (uncredited)
Transylvania Twist (1989) - Hans Hoff
The Haunting of Morella (1990) - Judge Brock
The Invisible Maniac (1990) - Dr. McWaters
Lionheart (1990) - English Investor
Brush with Death (1990) - Truman
Shining Through (1992) - BBC Interviewer
Body Parts (1992) - Jacoby
Live Wire (1992) - Dr. Bernard
Death Becomes Her (1992) - Opening Man
Over the Line (1992) - Dean Hemsley
American Ninja V (1993) - Glock
Robin Hood: Men in Tights (1993) - Royal Announcer
Fatal Instinct (1993) - (uncredited)
T-Force (1994) - UN Ambassador Chris Olsen
The American President (1995) - President D'Astier
Dark Secrets (1996) - Clement
The Evening Star (1996) - Pascal Ferney
The Beast Within: A Gabriel Knight Mystery (1996) - Herr Von Aigner
Jamaica Beat (1997) - Commissioner Byron Highsmith
The Landlady (1998) - Laurence Gerard
Intimate Lives: The Women of Manet (1998) - Antoine
The Debtors (1999)
Ty the Tasmanian Tiger (2002) - Boss Cass
Just Married (2003) - Car Rental Clerk
The Bard's Tale (2004)
Ty the Tasmanian Tiger 2: Bush Rescue (2004) - Boss Cass
Ty the Tasmanian Tiger 3: Night of the Quinkan (2005) - Boss Cass
Vidrio roto (2007)
The Kreutzer Sonata (2008) - Party Guest
Tony 5 (2008) - Rufus
The Least Among You (2009) - Stansfield Tremaine
Command Performance (2009) - Ambassador Jim Bradley
The Future (2011) - Alain First Solicitation
Take Me Home Tonight (2011) - Frances Triebverbrecher
Hopelessly in June (2011) - Sebastian Teal
The Five-Year Engagement (2012) - Grandpa Baba
Wallenda (2012 film) (2012) - Louis Weitzmann
Micky's Summer Resort (2014) - Congressman Brian Moley
Unfinished Business (2015) - Armand (uncredited)
Hail, Caesar! (2016) - Sen. Sestimus Amydias
Somebody's Mother (2016) - Monty
The Matadors (2017) - Lord Rothchild
Angels on Tap (2018) - Harry
Red Handed (2019) - Tillman

References

External links
 

1944 births
2019 deaths
20th-century English male actors
21st-century English male actors
British expatriates in the United States
20th-century American male actors
21st-century American male actors
English people of Austrian descent
Barons of Austria
People educated at Eton College
Male actors from Buckinghamshire
Male actors from Berkshire
People educated at Sunningdale School